is a commuter railway station on the Enoshima Electric Railway (Enoden) located in the Hase neighborhood of the city of Kamakura, Kanagawa Prefecture, Japan.

Lines
Hase Station is served by the Enoshima Electric Railway Main Line and is 8.3 kilometers from the terminus of the line at Fujisawa Station.

Station layout
The station consists of two opposed side platform serving two tracks, connected by a level crossing. The station is attended.

Platforms

History 
Hase Station was opened on 16 August 1907.
The current station building dates from April 2020.

Station numbering was introduced to the Enoshima Electric Railway January 2014 with Hase being assigned station number EN12.

Passenger statistics
In fiscal 2019, the station was used by an average of 9,276 passengers daily, making it the 4th used of the 15 Enoden stations.

The average passenger figures for previous years (boarding passengers only) are as shown below.

Surrounding area
Hase Station is located close to several of Kamakura's major tourist attractions, including the Kamakura Daibutsu and Hase-dera.

See also
 List of railway stations in Japan

References

External links

Enoden station information 

Railway stations in Kanagawa Prefecture
Railway stations in Japan opened in 1907
Kamakura, Kanagawa